Pompiliu Sorin Stoica (born 10 September 1976) is a Romanian footballer and current assistant manager for Liga III club CSO Plopeni.

Playing career

Club
Stoica started his senior career at hometown club Gloria Buzău, and went on to represent Astra Ploiești, Steaua București and Petrolul Ploiești in his country. He also had three stints abroad, of which two in Russia and one in Cyprus.

International
Between 2000 and 2006, Stoica earned eight caps and scored one goal for Romania at senior level.

Managerial career
In 2013, Stoica was appointed manager of lower league club Viitorul Buzău.

Personal life
Stoica's son, Ianis, is also a professional footballer. He followed in his father's footsteps by playing for Steaua București—now named FCSB—and Petrolul Ploiești.

Honours
Astra Ploiești
Liga II: 1997–98

Steaua București
Liga I: 2000–01, 2004–05
Supercupa României: 2001

FC Moscow
Russian Cup runner-up: 2006–07

Petrolul Ploiești
Liga II: 2010–11

References

External links

1976 births
Living people
People from Buzău
Romanian footballers
Association football defenders
Romania international footballers
Expatriate footballers in Russia
Liga I players
Liga III players
Russian Premier League players
Cypriot First Division players
FC Gloria Buzău players
FC Astra Giurgiu players
FC Steaua București players
FC Petrolul Ploiești players
FC Moscow players
FC Tom Tomsk players
Alki Larnaca FC players
Expatriate footballers in Cyprus
Romanian expatriate footballers
Romanian expatriate sportspeople in Russia
Romanian expatriate sportspeople in Cyprus
Romanian football managers